David Settle Reid (April 19, 1813 – June 19, 1891) was the 32nd governor of the U.S. state of North Carolina from 1851 to 1854 and a U.S. Senator from December 1854 to March 1859.  His uncle was Congressman Thomas Settle.

He was born in what would later be Reidsville, North Carolina, an unincorporated town named for his father, Reuben Reid.  He had a brother, Hugh Kearns Reid.  At age 16, David Reid became the first postmaster for the town.  He studied law and was admitted to the bar in 1833.  From 1835 to 1842, Reid served in the North Carolina Senate.  He was a U.S. Representative from 1843 to 1847.  Reid ran for governor in 1848 as a long-shot candidate. In his campaign, Reid promoted the now-obscure cause of "free suffrage," i.e. that there should not be different standards for who could vote for members of the North Carolina House of Commons and of the North Carolina Senate. It was assumed that more voters would only increase the Whig domination of the state, but the Whigs denounced suffrage reform as "a system of communism unjust and Jacobinical." To everyone's surprise, Reid lost to Charles Manly by only 854 votes. In 1850, Reid defeated Manly by 2,853 votes, becoming the first elected Democratic governor of North Carolina.

In the Senate, Reid was chairman of the Committee on Patents and the Patent Office.  He sought but was denied a full term in the Senate when he lost a three-way internal party fight with Thomas Bragg and William W. Holden in 1858.  He returned to the practice of law and was a delegate to the ill-fated 1861 Washington Peace Conference to try to prevent the American Civil War.  Reid was a member of a state constitutional convention in 1875.

In 1881 Reid suffered a stroke at Wentworth and died at his elder son's home in Reidsville in 1891 and is buried in Greenview Cemetery also in Reidsville. His widow died in 1913.

References

External links

History of Reidsville
 

1813 births
1891 deaths
Democratic Party governors of North Carolina
Democratic Party North Carolina state senators
People from Reidsville, North Carolina
North Carolina postmasters
Democratic Party United States senators from North Carolina
Democratic Party members of the United States House of Representatives from North Carolina
Settle family
19th-century American politicians